Kamil Adamczyk (born 7 May 1998) is a Polish handball player for Wybrzeże Gdańsk and the Polish national team.

References

1998 births
Living people
Sportspeople from Gdańsk
Polish male handball players
21st-century Polish people